Hedy Madeleine Fry,  (born August 6, 1941) is a Trinidadian-Canadian politician and physician who is currently the longest-serving female Member of Parliament, winning ten consecutive elections in the constituency of Vancouver Centre including the 1993 election, when she defeated incumbent Prime Minister Kim Campbell.

Early life and career
Fry was born in San Fernando, Trinidad and Tobago. She is of Scottish, Spanish, Indian, and Chinese ancestry. After declining an English Literature scholarship to Oxford, Fry earned her equivalent of a BA in Science in one year and then went on to receive her medical training at the Royal College of Surgeons in Dublin, Ireland. She immigrated to Canada in 1970 and established a practice in Vancouver.

Fry worked at St. Paul's Hospital (Vancouver) for 23 years. She served as president of the British Columbia Federation of Medical Women in 1977. She was president of the Vancouver Medical Association in 1988–89, the BC Medical Association in 1990–91, and chaired the Canadian Medical Association's Multiculturalism Committee in 1992–9. She volunteered as a Tawny Owl as a member of the Girl Guides of Canada, leading a Brownie group. Fry was also a host on the nationally televised CBC show Doctor Doctor.

Federal politics
Fry sought and won the Liberal Party nomination for Vancouver Centre for the 1993 federal election over lawyer David Varty and college lecturer John Lang in March 1993. She was elected to the House of Commons of Canada, defeating Progressive Conservative Prime Minister Kim Campbell. Fry was only the fifth person to unseat a sitting prime minister, and the first to do so on his or her first try for office. Fry has been re-elected in every subsequent election (1997, 2000, 2004, 2006, 2008, 2011, 2015, 2019 and 2021).

Chretien and Martin governments
She served as Parliamentary Secretary to the Minister of National Health and Welfare from 1993 until 1996 when she was appointed to the Cabinet as Secretary of State for Multiculturalism and Status of Women. Fry apologized to the people of Prince George, B.C. after she said in the House of Commons that “crosses are being burned on lawns as we speak”. Fry did not remain a minister after cabinet was shuffled in 2002.

When Paul Martin became Prime Minister of Canada at the end of 2003, he made her Parliamentary Secretary to the Minister of Citizenship and Immigration with special emphasis on Foreign Credentials. After the 2004 election, she was named Parliamentary Secretary to the Minister of Citizenship and Immigration and the Minister of Human Resources and Skills Development with special emphasis on the Internationally Trained Workers Initiative.

In opposition
In 2006, she beat high-profile NDP activist and former MP Svend Robinson and in 2008 she defeated high-profile Conservative Lorne Mayencourt. On May 4, 2006, Fry became the 11th person, 3rd woman, and the only Westerner to officially enter the Liberal party leadership race. Fry launched her leadership campaign saying that Canada's diversity is its greatest competitive advantage - "our weapon of mass inclusion" - and called for a "non-ideological" approach to problem solving. She withdrew from the contest on September 25 and announced her support for Bob Rae.

Re-elected in Vancouver Centre for a sixth term in 2008, Fry was appointed the Official Opposition Critic for Canadian Heritage. On November 21, 2008, Liberal leadership candidate Bob Rae announced that Fry would serve as his Campaign Co-Chair in British Columbia.

Fry was re-elected in 2011 by a margin of approximately 2,000 votes. When the Liberals lost power in 2006, Fry was named as Critic for Sport Canada in the Liberal shadow cabinet. In 2011, as the Liberals lost their designation as Official Opposition, Fry was named Liberal Critic for Health.

Trudeau government 
In the 2015 election, Fry won her riding once more, becoming the oldest Canadian MP and the longest serving female MP. During the 42nd Parliament, she was appointed to the National Security and Intelligence Committee of Parliamentarians, which provides oversight to Canada's security services and requires a Top Secret security clearance.

In the 2019 Election, Fry once again won her riding for a 9th consecutive term. She currently serves as the Special Representative for Gender Issues at the Organization for Security and Cooperation in Europe's Parliamentary Assembly, a role she has held since 2010. Fry is also a member of the Standing Committee on Foreign Affairs and International Development, and the Special Committee on the COVID-19 Pandemic.

Family
Fry has three adult sons and four grandchildren. Her eldest son, Pete Fry, was elected to Vancouver City Council in the 2018 municipal election.

Electoral record

References

External links
Official site
How'd They Vote?: Hedy Fry's voting history and quotes

1941 births
Living people
Alumni of the University of Oxford
Canadian people of Indian descent
Canadian people of Chinese descent
Canadian people of Scottish descent
Canadian people of Spanish descent
20th-century Canadian physicians
Canadian women physicians
Women members of the House of Commons of Canada
Liberal Party of Canada MPs
Members of the 26th Canadian Ministry
Members of the House of Commons of Canada from British Columbia
Members of the King's Privy Council for Canada
Politicians from Vancouver
Trinidad and Tobago emigrants to Canada
Trinidad and Tobago people of Indian descent
Women in British Columbia politics
21st-century Canadian women politicians
20th-century Canadian women politicians
Women government ministers of Canada
20th-century women physicians